Clytra quadripunctata is a species of leaf beetle in the subfamily Cryptocephalinae. Its common name is Four spotted leaf beetle.

Subspecies
Subspecies include: 
Clytra quadripunctata quadripunctata (Linnaeus, 1758)
Clytra quadripunctata puberula Weise, 1898

Distribution and habitat
This species is present in the western Palearctic realm from Europe (Bohemia, Moravia, France, Germany, Italy, Slovakia and the north of Spain) to Mongolia. They can be found on woody plants, roadside edges, dry grasslands and forest edges.

Description

These beetles show 4 black spots on the yellow-red wing covers. This species is very similar to  Clytra laeviuscula, but Clytra quadripunctata has rounded and smaller posterior spots on the elytra. 

The main criterion for distinguishing the two species is located in the center of the pronotum: it is regularly punctate in Clytra quadripunctata and not shiny, but smooth and shiny in Clytra laeviuscula.

Biology
Adults can be found from April to the end of August. This species of beetle is common in the spring on the flowering blackberry bushes and consumes the fruit. They feed on the leaves of various plants, including: Dactylis glomerata, Pteridium aquilinum, hawthorn (Crataegus), blackthorn (Prunus), willow (Salix), birch (Betula) and oak (Quercus). These beetles  lives near wood ants (genus Formica). The larvae develop in the nests of these ants.

Bibliography
Anderson, R., Nash, R. & O'Connor, J.P.. 1997, Irish Coleoptera: a revised and annotated list, Irish Naturalists' Journal Special Entomological Supplement, 1-81
du Chatenet, G, 2000, Coléoptères Phytophages D’Europe, NAP Editions,
Joy, N.H., 1932, A practical handbook of British beetles, H.F. & G. Witherby,
 This article has been expanded using, inter alia, material based on a translation of an article from the French Wikipedia, by the same name.

Gallery

References

Notes

Beetles described in 1758
Beetles of Asia
Beetles of Europe
Clytrini
Palearctic insects
Taxa named by Carl Linnaeus